Shandong University of Traditional Chinese Medicine (SDUTCM) is a university based in Jinan City, Shandong Province, China.

History
It was established on October 16, 1958 as the Shandong Traditional Chinese Medicine College. In 1978, the college became a national college for Traditional Chinese Medicine College. In 1981, the college was classified as a higher education institution in the province. In 1996, the university restructured into a public university and became officially as the Shandong University of Traditional Chinese Medicine.

References

External links
Shandong University of Traditional Chinese Medicine Official site

Traditional Chinese medicine
Universities and colleges in Jinan
Medical and health organizations based in China
1958 establishments in China